The Verse of Light is the 35th verse of the 24th surah of the Quran (Q24:35).

Verse

Commentary
The eighth Imam of the Twelver Imami Shiites Ali ibn Moses says in the interpretation of this verse:He is the guide of the people of heaven and the guide of the people of the earth.and the sixth Shiite Imam, Jafar Sadiq, has stated that:God first spoke of His light.

The example of God's guidance is in the heart of the believer.

The glorious is inside the believer and the lamp of his heart, and the lamp is the light that God has placed in his heart. Hence it was and remains a key Qur'anic passage to many Sufis and Muslim philosophers into the present day, who argue for esoteric readings of the Qur'an. al-Ghazali's reflections on this verse are collected in his Mishkat al-Anwar (the "Niche of Lights").

Often employed by Sufis and Muslim Philosophers, the verse is also the primary source of one of the 99 Names of God: an-Nur, "The Light".

Commentators on Ayat an-Nur include:

Avicenna
al-Ghazali
Fakhr al-Din al-Razi
Ibn al-'Arabi
Rumi
Mulla Sadra
Hakeem Noor-ud-Din
Mirza Basheer-ud-Din Mahmood Ahmad
Ibn Qayyim al-Jawziyya

See also 
Chapter
Verse of Throne
Esoteric interpretation of the Qur'an
Esotericism
Nūr (Islam)
Sufism
Chapter of Light

References

External links 
 Theophanies and Lights in the Thought of Ibn 'Arabi
Al-Ghazali. Mishkat al-Anwar (The Niche for Lights)
Hear Chapter "Noor" on Islamicity
Surah Noor, Holy Quran
Light Upon Light (Islamic Videos)
Haqiqaul Furqan, Tafsir of Maulana Hakeem Noor-ud-Din
Benefits of reading Surah noor (verse of light)
Summary Of Ibn Qayyim Tafsir Of Ayat Nur

Quranic verses
Esoteric interpretation of the Quran
An-Nur
Islamic theology
Allah
Light and religion